Mahni Sial, is a village and union council in Kabirwala Tehsil, Khanewal District, Punjab, Pakistan.

References

Populated places in Khanewal District